The pygmy cupwing (Pnoepyga pusilla) or pygmy wren-babbler, is a species of bird in the Pnoepyga wren-babblers family, Pnoepygidae. It is found in southern and eastern Asia from the Himalayas to the Lesser Sunda Islands. Its natural habitats are subtropical or tropical moist lowland forest and subtropical or tropical moist montane forest.

Gallery

References

Collar, N. J. & Robson, C. 2007. Family Timaliidae (Babblers)  pp. 70 – 291 in; del Hoyo, J., Elliott, A. & Christie, D.A. eds. Handbook of the Birds of the World, Vol. 12. Picathartes to Tits and Chickadees. Lynx Edicions, Barcelona.

External links
Video and photos - The Internet Bird Collection

pygmy wren-babbler
Birds of Bangladesh
Birds of Bhutan
Birds of Nepal
Birds of China
Birds of Southeast Asia
pygmy wren-babbler
Taxonomy articles created by Polbot